Tamara Nosova (21 November 1927 – 25 March 2007) was a Soviet and Russian actress, who was awarded the title of People's Artist of Russia in 1992. She appeared in 27 films between 1948 and 1999. She was married to writer Vitali Gubarev.

Biography
Nosova was born in Moscow, on 21 November 1927. In 1950, she graduated from the Gerasimov Institute of Cinematography in 1950. She was one of the most popular comedians of the 1950s and 1960s. Since the 1970s, she has rarely played in films. Nosova died on 25 March 2007. The urn with her ashes was buried at the Vagankovo Cemetery's columbarium.

Partial filmography

 The Young Guard (1948) as Valentina Filatova
 Stranitsy zhizni (1948) as Klava (uncredited)
 The Fall of Berlin (1950) as Katia
 Dream of a Cossack (1951) as Anfisa
 The Government Inspector (1952) as Maria Antonovna Skvoznik-Dmukhanovskaya
 The Safety Match (1954) as Akulina
 Gost s Kubani (1956) as Duska
 Carnival Night (1956) as Tosya Burigina, Ogurtsov's secretary
 Ona vas lyubit (1957) as Tamara
 Shtorm (1957)
 Konets Chirvy-Kozyrya (1957) as Paranya Piven
 Novye pokhozhdeniya Kota v Sapogakh (1958) as Court Lady Dvulichie
 Osobyy podkhod (1959) as Verochka
 Chernomorochka (1959) as Veronika - pevitsa
 Clear Skies (1961) as Factory Girl
 Kingdom of Crooked Mirrors (1963) as Aunt Aksal
 Balzaminov's Marriage (1965) as Nichkina
 Spyashchiy lev (1965) as Olimpiada Andreyevna
 Wedding in Malinovka (1967) as Komarikha
 Fire, Water, and Brass Pipes (1968) as Drowned woman
 The Brothers Karamazov (1969) as Marya Kondratyevna
 Paytyun kesgisherits heto (1969) as Galina
 Staryy znakomyy (1969) as Tosya Ogurtsova
 V tridevyatom tsarstve (1970) as Margo
 Besstrashnyy ataman (1973) as Uryadnichikha
 Hello, I'm Your Aunt! (1975, TV Movie) as Donna Rosa d'Alvadorez, millionaire
 Tolko kaplyu dushi (1978) as Korneliya
 Tayna chyornykh drozdov (1983) as Mrs. Crump
 Spokoystvie otmenyaetsya (1983)
 Dead Souls (1984, TV Mini-Series) as Korobochka
 Bulvarnyy roman (1994) as Fanni Lvovna Edelheim

External links

1927 births
2007 deaths
Actresses from Moscow
Soviet film actresses
People's Artists of Russia
Burials at Vagankovo Cemetery